Azan Vazan (also Romanized as Āzān Vāzān; also known as Āzān Owzān) is a village in Cham Chamal Rural District, Bisotun District, Harsin County, Kermanshah Province, Iran. At the 2006 census, its population was 260, in 57 families.

References 

Populated places in Harsin County